Maxime Daniel (born 5 June 1991 in Rennes) is a French former professional cyclist, who competed professionally between 2013 and 2019 for the ,  and  teams.

Major results

2012
 1st ZLM Tour
 Boucle de l'Artois
1st Stages 2 & 3
 5th Ronde Van Vlaanderen Beloften
2013
 1st Stage 6 Volta a Portugal
 9th Overall Tour de Picardie
 9th Châteauroux Classic
2014
 8th Overall Tour de Picardie
 9th La Roue Tourangelle
 9th Tour du Finistère
2017
 4th Halle–Ingooigem
 7th Grand Prix Pino Cerami
2019
 1st Stage 3 Vuelta a la Comunidad de Madrid

References

External links

1991 births
Living people
French male cyclists
Cyclists from Rennes